The Medina Masonic Temple and Medina Theater in Medina, Ohio was the first movie theater in Medina. Constructed in 1924 this two screen auditorium operated from 1937 until its closure in 2000. It was listed on the National Register of Historic Places in 2002.

The city of Medina purchased the building in July 2015 and voted to demolish it in July 2016 to make a gravel parking lot. The area has since been converted to a parking garage.

References

Clubhouses on the National Register of Historic Places in Ohio
Theatres on the National Register of Historic Places in Ohio
Neoclassical architecture in Ohio
Masonic buildings completed in 1924
Buildings and structures in Medina County, Ohio
National Register of Historic Places in Medina County, Ohio
Masonic buildings in Ohio